Catherine Cameron (born 2 December 1962) is an artist from Norway using photography as her prime medium.

Career
Cameron has been working with photography as artistic expression since 1999. Her works have been exhibited in the United Kingdom, USA, Argentina, China, Russia, Poland, France, Italy, Japan and Norway. She is represented within the permanent collections of the Museum of Fine Arts (Houston) and :it:Centro internazionale di fotografia Scavi Scaligeri in Verona, Italy. She is a member of Association of Norwegian Visual Artists.

She is based in Scotland.

Selected solo exhibitions
 2004 Fotografiens Hus, Oslo, Norway
 2007 LIPF 07, Lianzhou International Photo Festival, China (one of 48 "authors" invited)
 2007 Galerie Plume, Paris, France
 2008 Galerie Plume, Paris, France
 2008 Shanghai Sculpture Space, Shanghai, China
 2008 Łódź Foto Festiwal 08 Łódź, Polen (Grand Prix juried)
 2009 Fotofestivalen i Risør, Norway (invited)

Notes and references

External links 
 Catherine Cameron's homepage

Photographers from Oslo
Living people
1962 births
Norwegian women photographers